3300 North Central Avenue (also known as 3300 Tower) is a high-rise located along Central Avenue in Uptown Phoenix, Arizona, United States. Designed by Skidmore, Owings and Merrill, 3300 North Central Avenue was built in 1980. Oxford Properties was developer of the project, and Poole Construction was contractor. Upon completion, it stood as the fourth-tallest building in Phoenix and the tallest building outside of Downtown Phoenix. It was built as the headquarters of United Bank of Arizona (later purchased by Citibank, then Norwest). Today, it stands as the 12th-tallest building in the city. It is currently the headquarters of the Arizona State Retirement System.

Like its next door neighbor, the Great American Tower, 3300 North is rotated 45 degrees from the street grid. It is, however, an eight sided building with a 45-degree angle cut into each of the four corners. The building is covered with reflective glass with the exception of the corners, the crown and the lobby, which expose the concrete construction. 3300 North was designed at a time when the architectural trend was shifting away from the International Style and towards Post Modernism and thus, has elements of both architectural styles.

See also
 List of tallest buildings in Phoenix

References

Skyscraper office buildings in Phoenix, Arizona
Office buildings completed in 1980
Skidmore, Owings & Merrill buildings
1980 establishments in Arizona